Edward Bishop Dudley (February 19, 1901 – October 25, 1963) was an American professional golfer active in the late 1920s and 1930s. He was given the nickname of "Big Ed" in acknowledgment of his  frame.

Biography
Born in Brunswick, Georgia, Dudley was a 15-time winner on the PGA Tour. His achievements were mainly recognized retrospectively, since the PGA Tour of today did not formally exist as such; this situation was the same for all of his cohorts as well. The Tour as it was begun and evolved in the early 1920s, making Dudley one of its early pioneers. His first noteworthy professional results were made in the 1925 season, when he won the Oklahoma Open among other strong showings.

After winning both the Los Angeles and Western Opens in 1931, Dudley had his best year in 1933, when he was a quarter-finalist in the PGA Championship and won selection to the Ryder Cup team (having also played on the 1929 team). He won two key matches in the 1937 Ryder Cup, to help the United States win for the first time in Great Britain. In a total of four Ryder Cup matches played, Dudley compiled a record of three wins and one loss, across three Cup series. All Ryder Cup matches were played at 36 holes in that era. All three U.S. teams he played for (1929: Moor Park Golf Club, 1933: Southport and Ainsdale Golf Club, and 1937: again, Southport and Ainsdale) had to travel to Great Britain. Dudley also served as Ryder Cup honorary team captain in 1949, when the matches were played at the Ganton Golf Club in England; the USA also won that match.

Dudley finished 24 times in the top-10 at major championships, and this is a record among players who did not win at least one major. His high finishes in majors include third place at the PGA Championship in 1932, and at the Masters Tournament in 1937. In 1937, he became the first player to finish in the top-10 in all four majors in one year, a feat not repeated until Arnold Palmer in 1960.

Dudley served as the first head golf professional at the newly established Augusta National Golf Club, from 1932 to 1957. He served as president of the PGA of America from 1942 to 1948. He is a member of the PGA Hall of Fame. He was posthumously inducted into the Georgia Golf Hall of Fame in 1990. He was also the club professional at the Broadmoor Golf Club in Colorado Springs, Colorado for over two decades; this shared arrangement with Augusta National was possible because of the mainly mid-autumn through early spring season at Augusta National.

Among Dudley's most famous students were President Dwight Eisenhower, singer Bing Crosby, and comedian Bob Hope. Dudley died of a heart attack in Colorado Springs, one week after undergoing surgery to remove blood clots from his leg.

Professional wins (19)

PGA Tour wins (15)
1928 (1) Southern California Pro
1929 (2) Pennsylvania Open Championship, Philadelphia Open Championship
1930 (2) Shawnee Open, Pennsylvania Open Championship
1931 (2) Los Angeles Open, Western Open
1932 (1) Miami International Four-Ball (with Tommy Armour)
1933 (2) Philadelphia Open Championship, Hershey Open
1935 (1) True Temper Open Championship
1936 (2) Shawnee Open, Philadelphia Open Championship
1937 (1) Sacramento Open
1939 (1) Walter Hagen 25th Anniversary (with Billy Burke)

Other wins (4)
1925 Oklahoma Open
1926 Oklahoma Open
1940 Philadelphia Open Championship
1942 Utah Open

Results in major championships

NYF = tournament not yet founded
NT = no tournament
WD = withdrew
CUT = missed the half-way cut
R64, R32, R16, QF, SF = round in which player lost in PGA Championship match play
"T" indicates a tie for a place

Summary

Most consecutive cuts made – 29 (1933 Open Championship – 1946 Masters)
The longest streak of top-10s – 6 (1936 PGA – 1938 Masters)

See also
List of golfers with most PGA Tour wins

References

External links
Philadelphia PGA Class of 1992 Ed Dudley

American male golfers
PGA Tour golfers
Ryder Cup competitors for the United States
Golf administrators
Golfers from Georgia (U.S. state)
Golfers from Colorado
People from Brunswick, Georgia
Sportspeople from Colorado Springs, Colorado
1901 births
1963 deaths